Kazimierz Ładysław Materski (September 23, 1906 – February 3, 1971) was a Polish ice hockey player who competed in the 1932 Winter Olympics.

He was born and died in Warsaw.

In 1932 he was a member of the Polish ice hockey team which finished fourth in the Olympic tournament. He played all six matches.

He fought in the September Campaign of World War II and later served in the corps of general Władysław Anders. Materski returned to Poland in 1947.

External links
 profile 

1906 births
1971 deaths
Olympic ice hockey players of Poland
Ice hockey players at the 1932 Winter Olympics
Polish military personnel of World War II
Sportspeople from Warsaw
People from Warsaw Governorate